Verdun-sur-le-Doubs (literally Verdun on the Doubs) is a commune in the Saône-et-Loire department in the region of Bourgogne-Franche-Comté in eastern France.

Position and history

It has been more than a farmstead since early medieval times and acted as a fortified place at the French kingdom's frontier for several centuries.

As to the German military administration in occupied France during World War II Verdun-sur-le-Doubs was on the north-south Demarcation Line.

Community of communes
Since 2014, Verdun-sur-le-Doubs is part of the Communauté de communes Saône Doubs Bresse.

Economy
Today it is, aside from retirement, a highly agricultural and touristic local economy well known for fishing, river boating, local produce and cuisine.  is the local dish of various freshwater fish, dry Burgundy white wine (Bourgogne aligoté), cream, herbs and seasoning.

See also
Communes of the Saône-et-Loire department

References

External links

Tourism office

Communes of Saône-et-Loire